Riverview School is a private boarding/day school for students, ages 11–22, with complex language, learning and cognitive challenges located on Cape Cod, Massachusetts. Students hail from every region of the United States and from many foreign countries.  

Riverview is accredited by the New England Association of Schools and Colleges (NEASC), licensed by the Department of Early Education and Care (DEEC) and approved by the Massachusetts Department of Elementary and Secondary Education (DESE).

Boarding schools in Massachusetts
Educational institutions established in 1957
Schools in Barnstable County, Massachusetts
1957 establishments in Massachusetts